Aucugals is one of the suburbs of Liepāja, Latvia.

It is located south of the city of Liepaja in Nica Municipality.

References 

Neighbourhoods in Liepāja